Ma Kyay Si is a 2022 Burmese drama television series. The series was the last creation of director Aung Ba Power. It is an adaptation of the comic book "Ma Kyay Si" by Min Thike. It aired on MRTV-4, from February 3 to March 18, 2022, on Mondays to Fridays at 19:00 for 32 episodes.

Synopsis
Baby Ma Kyay Si was found at Shwe Kye Si Pagoda. The villagers of Thongpanhla believe that Ma Kyay Si came from the nest believing the words of a fool. She was accused of being an evil spirit and bullied by Moe Wah, San San and Thazin. But only Ba Thet Shay, her adoptive mother; Daw Wah, and fool Pauk Kyi loved her. One day she fell in love with Min Naing. Min Naing died because of the fortune teller's snake. Then she fell in love with Aye Lwin and went to his house to get married. Aye Lwin's lower body died in a car accident. They then drove the Ma Kyay Si out of the village, calling her a bad omen. She fell in love with and married Kyaw Htin from Nyaung Kyat village. At first it was okay, but later Kyaw Htin's father, U Kyaw Pe believed U Lun Tin's words and thought that Ma Kye Si was an evil spirit. U Kyaw Pe later asked Ma Kye Si to sign a divorce agreement and evict her. She then met with historian Wai Lin Maung. Wai Lin Maung has a girlfriend and her name is Nway. Ma Kyay Si got a job at Nway's hotel in Bagan. Later, Kyaw Htin went insane because Ma Kyay Si did not return to him, and Ma Kyay Si was shot dead by Kyaw Pe.

Cast
Nat Khat as Wai Lin Maung
May Mi Ko Ko as Ma Kyay Si
Hein Yatu as Kyaw Htin
Lin Myat as Min Naing
Thura Maung Cho as Aye Lwin
Khoon Nay Chi Cho as Moe Wah
Shin Min Sett as Thazin
Sharr as San San
Su Sandi Yoon as May Kha
Hsu Waddy as Nway
Nyi Nyi Min Htet as U Kyaw Pe
Lu Mone as Ba Thet Shay
Daung Wai as U Loon Tin
Kan Pwint as Pauk Kyi
Man Hein as Than Lone

References

Burmese television series
MRTV (TV network) original programming